The Japanese aircraft carrier  was the lead ship of her class of three escort carriers. The ship was requisitioned by the Imperial Japanese Navy (IJN) in early 1941 and was converted into an escort carrier. Taiyō was initially used to transport aircraft to distant air bases and for training, but was later used to escort convoys of merchant ships between Japan and Singapore. The ship was torpedoed twice by American submarines with negligible to moderate damage before she was sunk in mid-1944 with heavy loss of life.

Civilian background and configuration

The Nitta Maru-class ships were intended to upgrade the passenger service of NYK (Japan Mail Shipping Line) to Europe and it was reported that Nitta Maru was the first ship to be fully air conditioned in the passenger quarters. The IJN subsidized all three Nitta Maru-class ships for possible conversion into auxiliary aircraft carriers. Kasuga Maru was the last ship of her class and was built by Mitsubishi Shipbuilding & Engineering Co. at their Nagasaki shipyard for NYK. She was laid down on 6 January 1940 as yard number 752 and launched on 19 September 1940. Sources are contradictory regarding when the conversion occurred and if the ship was completed before the conversion began. Jentschura, Jung and Mickel state that Kasuga Maru was towed to Sasebo Naval Arsenal for conversion on 1 May 1941. Stille, however, and Watts & Gordon say the conversion began while the ship was under construction. This is indirectly supported by the allocation of a new yard number, 888, to the ship. Tully, on the other hand, says that she was requisitioned on 10 February 1941 and was used as a transport until the conversion began on 1 May.

She would have had a net tonnage of 9,397 and a cargo capacity of 11,800 tons. The Nitta Maru class had accommodation for 285 passengers (127 first class, 88 second and 70 third).

The ships were powered by two sets of geared steam turbines made by the shipbuilder, each driving one propeller shaft, using steam produced by four water-tube boilers.

Conversion and description
Kasuga Marus conversion was completed at Sasebo Naval Arsenal on 2 or 5 or 15 September 1941. Unlike her sister ships, Kasuga Maru could accommodate 23 aircraft, plus 4 spares.

Kasuga Marus crew numbered 747 officers and ratings.

The ship was equipped with six 12-centimeter (4.7 in) 10th Year Type anti-aircraft (AA) guns in single mounts on sponsons along the sides of the hull. Her light AA consisted of eight license-built  Type 96 light AA guns in four twin mounts, also in sponsons along the sides of the hull. In early 1943, the 25 mm twin mounts were replaced by triple mounts and additional 25 mm guns were added. Taiyō had a total of 22 guns plus 5 license-built  Type 93 anti-aircraft machineguns. The ship also received a Type 13 air-search radar in a retractable installation on the flight deck at that time. In July 1944, the 12-centimeter guns were replaced by two twin mounts for  Type 89 dual-purpose guns and the light AA armament was augmented to a total of sixty-four 25-millimeter guns and ten 13.2-millimeter machine guns.

Career
Before the start of the Pacific War on 7 December 1941, Kasuga Maru had made two voyages to Formosa and Palau, including one ferrying Mitsubishi A5M (Allied reporting name: "Claude") fighters to Palau just days before the beginning of the war. In between transport missions, the ship trained naval aviators. Shortly after Kasuga Maru arrived at Rabaul on 11 April, the harbor was bombed twice, although the ship was not damaged in the attacks. On 14 July, she was assigned to the Combined Fleet, together with her sister, . Upon receiving news of the American landings on Guadalcanal on 7 August, Kasuga Maru and the battleship , escorted by a pair of destroyers, together with the 2nd and 3rd Fleets sailed from the Inland Sea bound for Truk. On 27 August, the carrier was detached from the main body and sent to deliver aircraft to Taroa Island in the Marshalls. She arrived two days later and then departed on 30 August for Truk. The following day, Kasuga Maru was formally renamed Taiyō (大鷹, “goshawk”).

After arriving in Truk on 4 September, the ship was sent to Palau, Davao City, and Kavieng. En route to Truk, she was torpedoed by the submarine  on 28 September 1942. Taiyō was hit once, killing 13 crewmen, but was able to continue to Truk for emergency repairs. She left for Japan on 4 October for permanent repairs that were not completed until the 26th. The ship then resumed ferrying aircraft from Japan to Truk and Kavieng on 1 November. In February–March 1943, she was accompanied by Un'yō. The following month, Un'yō was replaced by Chūyō. Taiyō and Chūyō, escorted by two destroyers departed Truk, bound for Yokosuka, Japan, on 16 April. After another voyage to Truk and Mako, Formosa, the ship was briefly refitted at Sasebo. The hit wrecked her starboard propeller and temporarily knocked out power so she had to be towed to Yokosuka by Chūyō. Repairs began once she arrived and lasted until 11 November.

In December 1943, Taiyō was assigned to the Grand Escort Command and she began a lengthy refit at Yokohama that completed on 4 April 1944. On the 29th, the ship was assigned to the First Surface Escort Unit and she escorted Convoy HI-61 from Japan to Singapore, via Manila. Upon arrival at her destination on 18 May, Taiyō was tasked to escort Convoy HI-62 home. After arriving on 8 June, the ship was assigned to carry aircraft to Manila, departing on 12 July. En route, she joined up with the escort of Convoy HI-69 and arrived there on the 20th. Taiyō then escorted a convoy to Formosa and then back to Japan. On 10 August, the ship escorted Convoy HI-71 to Singapore, via Mako and Manila. The hit caused the carrier's aft avgas tank to explode, and Taiyō sank 28 minutes later at coordinates . The number of passengers aboard is unknown, but 350–400 was common practice at that time. Coupled with the 400-odd survivors rescued and the authorized complement of 834, that suggests that approximately 790 passengers and crew were lost in the sinking.

See also
 List by death toll of ships sunk by submarines

Notes

Citations

References

External links
 Japanese-language page on the ship

Taiyō-class escort carriers
Taiyō
1940 ships
World War II escort carriers of Japan
Ships sunk by American submarines
World War II shipwrecks in the South China Sea
Maritime incidents in August 1944